William Irwin Thompson (16 July  1938—8 November 2020) was an American social philosopher, cultural critic, and poet. He received the Oslo International Poetry Festival Award in 1986. He described his writing and speaking style as "mind-jazz on ancient texts". He was the founder of the Lindisfarne Association, which proposed the study and realization of a new planetary culture.

Biography
Thompson was born in Chicago, Illinois, and grew up in Los Angeles, California. Thompson received his B.A. at Pomona College and his Ph.D. at Cornell University. He was a professor of humanities at the Massachusetts Institute of Technology and then at York University in Toronto, Ontario. He has held visiting appointments at Syracuse University (in 1973 - where he taught "Resacralization and the Emergence of a Planetary Culture"), the University of Hawaii, the University of Toronto and the California Institute of Integral Studies (1992).

In 1973, he left academia to found the Lindisfarne Association. The Association, which he led from 1972 to 2012, was a group of scientists, poets, and religious scholars who met in order to discuss and to participate in the emerging planetary culture. Thompson lived in Switzerland for 17 years. He describes a recent work, Canticum Turicum in his 2009 book, Still Travels: Three Long Poems, as "a long poem on Western Civilization that begins with folktales and traces of Charlemagne in Zurich and ends with the completion of Western Civilization as expressed in Finnegans Wake and the traces of James Joyce in Zurich."

Thompson was a Founding Mentor to the private K-12 Ross School in East Hampton, New York. In 1995, with mathematician Ralph Abraham, he designed a new type of cultural history curriculum based on their theories about the evolution of consciousness. Thompson lived his retired years in Portland, Maine.

Work
Thompson did his Master's Essay at Cornell on applying the process philosophy of Alfred North Whitehead to poetry; he did his doctoral dissertation on the Easter Rising in Dublin 1916. While serving on the faculty at MIT in the 1960s, Thompson met famed media ecologist Marshall McLuhan, who would influence Thompson's writings on cultural history. Thompson engages a diverse set of traditions, including the Swiss cultural historian Jean Gebser, the Vedic philosopher Sri Aurobindo Ghose, the autopoetic epistemology of Francisco Varela, the endosymbiotic theory of evolution of Lynn Margulis, the Gaia Theory of James Lovelock, the complex systems thought of Ralph Abraham, the novels of Thomas Pynchon, and the  daimonic transmissions of mystic David Spangler.

Style
Performance is central to Thompson's approach. Performances either open new horizons for the future or close them down, and should be judged on that basis. Thompson thought that with the emergence of the integral era and its electronic media expressions that a new mode of discourse was required. He sought "to turn non-fiction into a work of art on its own terms. Rather than trying to be a scholar or a journalist writing on the political and cultural news of the day, I worked to become a poetic reporter on the evolutionary news of the epoch". He espoused the notion that one must express an integral approach not just in content but in the very means of expressing it. Thompson did this in the way he approached teaching: "The traditional academic lecture also became for me an occasion to transform the genre, to present not an academic reading of a paper, but a form of Bardic performance–not stories of battles but of the new ideas that were emerging around the world...The course was meant to be a performance of the very reality it sought to describe".

"Wissenskunst" (literally, "knowledge-art") is a German term that Thompson coined to describe his own work. Contrasting it with Wissenschaft, the German term for science, Thompson defines Wissenskunst as "the play of knowledge in a world of serious data-processors."As fiction and music are coming closer to reorganizing knowledge, scholarship is becoming closer to art. Our culture is changing, and so the genres of literature and history are changing as well. In an agricultural-warrior society, the genre is the epic, an Iliad. In an industrial-bourgeois society, the genre is the novel, a Moll Flanders. In our electronic, cybernetic society, the genre is Wissenkunst: the play of knowledge in a world of serious data-processors. The scholarly fictions of Jorge Luis Borges, or the reviews of non-existent books by Stanislaw Lem, are examples of new art forms of a society in which humanity live, not innocently in nature nor confidently in cities, but apocalyptically in a civilization cracking up to the universe. At such a moment as this the novelist becomes a prophet, the composer a magician, and the historian a bard, a voice recalling ancient identities.

Works

The Time Falling Bodies Take to Light
In his acclaimed 1981 work The Time Falling Bodies Take to Light: Mythology, Sexuality and the Origins of Culture, Thompson criticized what he considers the hubristic pretensions of E. O. Wilson's sociobiology, which attempted to subsume the humanities to evolutionary biology. Thompson then reviewed and critiqued the scholarship on the emergence of civilization from the Paleolithic to the historical period. He analyzed the assumptions and prejudices of the various anthropologists and historians who have written on the subject, and attempted to paint a more balanced picture. He described the task of the historian as closer to that of the artist and poet than to that of the scientist.Because we have separated humanity from nature, subject from object, values from analysis, knowledge from myth, and universities from the universe, it is enormously difficult for anyone but a poet or a mystic to understand what is going on in the holistic and mythopoeic thought of Ice Age humanity. The very language we use to discuss the past speaks of tools, hunters, and men, when every statue and painting we discover cries out to us that this Ice Age humanity was a culture of art, the love of animals, and women.

Thompson sees the Stone Age religion expressed in the Venus figurines, Lascaux cave paintings, Çatal Hüyük, and other artifacts to be an early form of shamanism. He believes that as humanity spread across the globe and was divided into separate cultures, this universal shamanistic Mother Goddess religion became the various esoteric traditions and religions of the world. Using this model, he analyzed Egyptian mythology, Sumerian hymns, the Epic of Gilgamesh, the cult of Quetzalcoatl, and many other stories, myths, and traditions. Thompson often refers to Kriya yoga and Yoga Nidra throughout these analyses, and this seems to be the spiritual tradition with which he is most comfortable.

Coming Into Being
In his 1996 work Coming into Being: Artifacts and Texts in the Evolution of Consciousness, Thompson applied an approach that was similar to his 1981 book to many other artifacts, cultures and historical periods. A notable difference, however, is that the 1996 work was influenced by the work of cultural phenomenologist Jean Gebser. Works and authors analyzed include the Enuma Elish, Homer, Hesiod, Sappho, the Book of Judges, the Rig Veda, Ramayana, Upanishads, Bhagavad Gita, and the Tao Te Ching. Thompson analyzed these works using the vocabulary of contemporary cognitive theory and chaos theory, as well as theories of history. An expanded paperback version was released in 1998.

The phrase "Coming into being" is a translation of the Greek term gignesthai, from which the word genesis is derived.

Self and Society
In his 2004 book Self and Society: Studies in the Evolution of Consciousness, and in collaboration with the mathematician Ralph Abraham, Thompson related Gebser's structures to periods in the development of mathematics (arithmetic, geometric, algebraic, dynamical, chaotic) and in the history of music.

Interests

Thompson considers James Joyce's stylistically experimental novel Finnegans Wake to be "the ultimate novel, indeed, the ultimate book," and also to be the climactic artistic work of the modern period and of the rational mentality. Thompson is fascinated by Los Angeles, where he grew up, and Disneyland, which he considers to be LA's essence. He has also written a book-length treatment of the Easter Rising of 1916.

Thompson has critiqued postmodern literary criticism, artificial intelligence, the technological futurism of Raymond Kurzweil, the contemporary philosophy of mind theories of Daniel Dennett and Paul Churchland, and the astrobiological cosmogony of Zecharia Sitchin.

Reception
Thompson's second book, At the Edge of History was reviewed in The New York Times by Christopher Lehmann-Haupt in March 1971.

Thompson's 1974 Passages About Earth was reviewed in Time. The reviewer wrote:From ample but largely gloomy evidence of rapid social change — future shock, ecological disruption, population explosion, proliferation of information — Thompson draws a startling conclusion: "We are the climactic generation of human cultural evolution." Man, he asserts, will now either slide back into a new Dark Age or evolve into a higher, more spiritual being.Which way will we go? The author opts for evolution. While such optimism is as welcome as it is rare these days, it is largely based on mysticism and intimations of a "new planetary culture," which Thompson shares with Philosopher Teilhard de Chardin and Science-Fiction Writer Arthur C. Clarke. This is thin epistemological ice even for a skater as fast as Thompson. Indeed, incredulous readers may drop the book after the first reference to "our lost cosmological orientation." That would be a mistake. Agree with it or not, Passages is always fascinating, a magical mystery tour of man's potential.

Thompson's 1981 book The Time Falling Bodies Take To Light: Mythology, Sexuality, and the Origins of Culture was reviewed in the New York Times Book Review by Christopher Lehmann-Haupt. Lehmann-Haupt concluded:In The Time Falling Bodies Take to Light, William Irwin Thompson has gone part of the way toward rescuing mysticism from its Western friends. But only part of the way.

In his book 2012: The Return of Quetzalcoatl, Daniel Pinchbeck referred to Thompson as a cultural critic, a mystic, a practicing yogi, "one of the few modern intellectuals to appreciate Steiner's work", andone of a small number of original thinkers who not only understands our present impasse but realizes it is not the whole story. Something else is taking place as well— a sidereal movement of consciousness returning us to levels of awareness denied and repressed by the materialist thrust of our current civilization. Essential in this process, according to Thompson, is a change in our understanding of myth. We can change "from a postmodern sensibility in which myth is regarded as an absolute and authoritarian system of discourse to a planetary culture in which myth is regarded as isomorphic, but not identical to scientific narratives."

Selected works
 The Language of "Finnegans Wake" (The Sewanee Review Vol. 72, No. 1 (Winter, 1964), pp. 78–90)
Collapsed universe and structured poem: An essay in Whiteheadian criticism (thesis), (College English, October 1966)
The Imagination of an Insurrection: Dublin, Easter 1916: A Study of an Ideological Movement, 1967
At the Edge of History: Speculations on the Transformation of Culture, 1971 
The Individual as Institution: The Example of Paolo Soleri. Harper's, 1972
Passages about Earth: An Exploration of the New Planetary Culture, 1974
Evil and World Order, 1976
Darkness and Scattered Light, 1978
The Time Falling Bodies Take to Light: Mythology, Sexuality and the Origins of Culture, 1981, 2001 
From Nation to Emanation: Planetary Culture and World Governance, 1982
Blue Jade from the Morning Star: An Essay and a Cycle of Poems on Quetzalcoatl, 1983
Pacific Shift, 1986
Gaia, A Way of Knowing, 1988 (editor)
Selected Poems, 1959-1980, 1989
Imaginary Landscape: Making Worlds of Myth and Science, 1989 
Gaia Two: Emergence, The New Science of Becoming, 1991 (editor)
Islands Out of Time: A Memoir of the Last Days of Atlantis: A Novel, 1990
Reimagination of the World: A Critique of the New Age, Science, and Popular Culture (with David Spangler), 1991
The American Replacement of Nature: The Everyday Acts and Outrageous Evolution of Economic Life, 1991 
Worlds Interpenetrating and Apart: Collected Poems, 1959-1995, 1997
Coming into Being: Artifacts and Texts in the Evolution of Consciousness, 1996, 1998 
Transforming History: A Curriculum for Cultural Evolution, 2001  & 2009. 
Self and Society: Studies in the Evolution of Culture, 2004 & 2009, ; .
A Diary of Sorts and Streets, Poems, 2007 (Onteros Press: P. O. Box 5720, Santa Fe NM 87502) 
 Still Travels: Three Long Poems, (Wild River Books: Princeton, NJ, 2009).
 Beyond Religion: The Culture Evolution of the Sense of the Sacred from Shamanism to Post-Religious spirituality (Lindisfarne Books: Great Barrington, MA, 2013) 
 Nightwatch and Dayshift: Poems 2007-2014 (Wild River Books, Stockton, NJ). 
 Thinking Together At The Edge Of History: A Memoir of the Lindisfarne Association, 1972-2012 (Lorian Press LLC, 2016).

Notes

External links

The Evolution of William Irwin Thompson Cultural Historian a 2006 essay by Joy E. Stocke
The Science of Myth, an interview.
Audio cassette sales of Thompson's lectures
 Thompson's Curriculum Vitae

By Thompson

Essays
Foreword to Canticum, Turicum, 2005
 "This Time, Let's Build a New Venice and Not Another New Orleans" and "The Need for a Tricameral Legislature"], 2005 :wq
"The Case for Teaching Geometry before Algebra", 2005 (PDF file) 
"Al Qaeda, the Neocons, and the Transition from Nation-State to Noetic Polity (RTF file)
"The Borg or Borges?" (PDF file), 2003
"The Cultural Phenomenology of Literature", 2002
"Studies in the Evolution of Culture" (Introduction to Self and Society) (PDF file), 2002
"The Evolution of the Afterlife" (PDF file), 2002
"Speculations on the City and the Evolution of Consciousness", 2000 (PDF file)
The Ross School Supplemental webpages by Ralph Herman Abraham and William Irwin Thompson
, 1998
"Nine Theses For A Gaia Politique", 1986
"It's Already Begun: The Planetary Age is an unacknowledged daily reality", 1986
"The Metaindustrial Village: A possible future encapsulates history...and moves beyond", 1983

Poems
"Still Travels" Wild River Review, 2007
Canticum, Turicum, 2006
"Cambridge Rant"
"The Lessons of History" a poem-essay
 "Sunset at Point Lobos"], 1964
"The Death of Neda", 2009

About Thompson
The Gaian Politics of Lindisfarne’s William Irwin Thompson by Ralph Peters, 2002
"William Irwin Thompson" by Grant Schuyler
"Coming Into Being: A Reader's Journal" by Bobby Matherne, 1997
 Booklist review of Coming into Being] by Patricia Monaghan
Union of Int'l Associations' Global Strategies Project "Patterns of alternation: toward an enantiomorphic policy"
NYT review of The Time Falling Bodies Take to Light by Christopher Lehmann-Haupt, January 22, 1981
Encyclopedia Barfieldiana entry on Thompson
Lindisfarne Cafe Memoir in Wild River Review, wildriverreview.com:
LINDISFARNE CAFE - MEMOIR - Building a Dream - PART ONE: Lindisfarne in Crestone, Colorado, 1979-1997
LINDISFARNE CAFE - MEMOIR - Building a Dream/The Shadow Side PART TWO: Lindisfarne in Crestone, Colorado, 1979-1997
LINDISFARNE CAFE - MEMOIR - Building a Dream/The Cathedral PART THREE: Lindisfarne in Crestone, Colorado, 1979-1997
LINDISARNE CAFE - MEMOIR - Conclusion: The Economic Relevance of Lindisfarne

Citations
Google Scholar

1938 births
2020 deaths
20th-century American historians
20th-century American novelists
20th-century American poets
21st-century American historians
21st-century American novelists
21st-century American poets
American male non-fiction writers
American male novelists
American male poets
American philosophers
American consciousness researchers and theorists
Cornell University faculty
Critics of neoconservatism
Critics of postmodernism
Epistemologists
Findhorn community
20th-century mystics
Mythographers
New Age writers
Novelists from Illinois
Novelists from New York (state)
Philosophers of mind
Philosophers of technology
Pomona College alumni
Social philosophers
Writers from Chicago
American yogis
20th-century American male writers
21st-century American male writers
Historians from Illinois
Historians from California